The following articles contain lists of tunnels:

 List of tunnels by location
 List of longest tunnels
 List of long tunnels by type

See also :Category:Lists of tunnels and :Category:Tunnels.